Bertil Fiskesjö  (July 9, 1928 – 30 November 2019)  was a Swedish politician and a member of the Centre Party. Fiskesjö was born in Algutsboda, studied at Lund University, and became a university lecturer in political science.

He was a member of the Riksdag from 1971 to 1994. He was one of the four participants reaching the "Torekov Compromise", which settled the role of the Swedish monarchy as a ceremonial institution without any political powers. Fiskesjö later served as the Third Deputy Speaker of the Riksdag from 1986 to 1994.

References

1928 births 
2019 deaths
Members of the Riksdag from the Centre Party (Sweden)